Peats Ridge is a suburb in the Central Coast region of New South Wales, Australia, as part of the  local government area.

Peats Ridge was opened to white settlement relatively late, as the Great North Road to the Hunter Valley left from Spencer on the Hawkesbury River, effectively bypassing the area until the early part of the 20th century.  The area is named for George Peat. A number of fine aboriginal rock carvings survive in Peats Ridge.

Formerly an area with many citrus orchards and market gardens, the improved access to Sydney through the Sydney-Newcastle Freeway has meant that it has increasingly become the home of commuters with jobs in Sydney.  There are a number of nurseries and horse studs in the district.

References

Suburbs of the Central Coast (New South Wales)